The 65th Writers Guild of America Awards honor the best film, television, radio and video-game writers of 2012. The television and radio nominees were announced on December 6, 2012. Film nominees were announced on January 4, 2013. All winners were announced on February 17, 2013 at the JW Marriott Hotel in the L.A. Live entertainment complex.

Winners and nominees

Film

Original
Zero Dark Thirty — Mark Boal; Columbia Pictures
Flight — John Gatins; Paramount Pictures
Looper — Rian Johnson; TriStar Pictures
The Master — Paul Thomas Anderson; The Weinstein Company
Moonrise Kingdom — Wes Anderson and Roman Coppola; Focus Features

Adapted
''Argo — Screenplay by Chris Terrio, based on a selection from The Master of Disguise by Tony Mendez and the Wired magazine article "The Great Escape" by Joshuah Bearman; Warner Bros. PicturesLife of Pi — Screenplay by David Magee, based on the novel by Yann Martel; 20th Century Fox
Lincoln — Screenplay by Tony Kushner, based in part on the book Team of Rivals: The Political Genius of Abraham Lincoln by Doris Kearns Goodwin; DreamWorks Pictures, 20th Century Fox, and Touchstone Pictures
The Perks of Being a Wallflower — Screenplay by Stephen Chbosky, based on his novel; Summit Entertainment
Silver Linings Playbook — Screenplay by David O. Russell, based on the novel by Matthew Quick; The Weinstein Company

DocumentarySearching for Sugar Man — Malik Bendjelloul; Sony Pictures ClassicsThe Central Park Five — Sarah Burns, David McMahon and Ken Burns; Sundance Selects
The Invisible War — Kirby Dick; Cinedigm Entertainment Group
Mea Maxima Culpa: Silence in the House of God — Alex Gibney; HBO Films
We Are Legion — Brian Knappenberger; Cinetic Media
West of Memphis — Amy J. Berg and Billy McMillin; Sony Pictures Classics

Television

Drama seriesBreaking Bad — Sam Catlin, Vince Gilligan, Peter Gould, Gennifer Hutchison, George Mastras, Thomas Schnauz, Moira Walley-Beckett; AMCBoardwalk Empire — Dave Flebotte, Diane Frolov, Chris Haddock, Rolin Jones, Howard Korder, Steve Kornacki, Andrew Schneider, David Stenn, Terence Winter; HBO
Game of Thrones — David Benioff, Bryan Cogman, Jane Espenson, George R. R. Martin, D. B. Weiss; HBO
Homeland — Henry Bromell, Alexander Cary, Alex Gansa, Howard Gordon, Chip Johannessen, Gideon Raff, Meredith Stiehm; Showtime
Mad Men — Lisa Albert, Semi Chellas, Jason Grote, Jonathan Igla, Andre Jacquemetton, Maria Jacquemetton, Brett Johnson, Janet Leahy, Victor Levin, Erin Levy, Frank Pierson, Michael Saltzman, Tom Smuts, Matthew Weiner; AMC

Comedy SeriesLouie — Pamela Adlon, Vernon Chatman, Louis C.K.; FX30 Rock — Jack Burditt, Kay Cannon, Robert Carlock, Tom Ceraulo, Vali Chandrasekaran, Luke Del Tredici, Tina Fey, Lauren Gurganous, Matt Hubbard, Colleen McGuinness, Sam Means, Dylan Morgan, Nina Pedrad, John Riggi, Josh Siegel, Ron Weiner, Tracey Wigfield; NBC
Girls — Judd Apatow, Lesley Arfin, Lena Dunham, Sarah Heyward, Bruce Eric Kaplan, Jenni Konner, Deborah Schoeneman, Dan Sterling; HBO
Modern Family — Cindy Chupack, Paul Corrigan, Abraham Higginbotham, Ben Karlin, Elaine Ko, Steven Levitan, Christopher Lloyd, Dan O’Shannon, Jeffrey Richman, Audra Sielaff, Brad Walsh, Bill Wrubel, Danny Zuker; ABC
Parks and Recreation — Megan Amram, Greg Daniels, Nate Dimeo, Katie Dippold, Daniel J. Goor, Norm Hiscock, Dave King, Greg Levine, Joe Mande, Aisha Muharrar, Nick Offerman, Chelsea Peretti, Amy Poehler, Alexandra Rushfield, Mike Scully, Michael Schur, Harris Wittels, Alan Yang; NBC

New SeriesGirls — Judd Apatow, Lesley Arfin, Lena Dunham, Sarah Heyward, Bruce Eric Kaplan, Jenni Konner, Deborah Schoeneman, Dan Sterling; HBOThe Mindy Project — Ike Barinholtz, Jeremy Bronson, Linwood Boomer, Adam Countee, Harper Dill, Mindy Kaling, Chris McKenna, B.J. Novak, David Stassen, Matt Warburton; Fox
Nashville — Wendy Calhoun, Jason George, David Gould, David Marshall Grant, Dee Johnson, Todd Ellis Kessler, Callie Khouri, Meredith Lavender, Nancy Miller, James Parriott, Liz Tigelaar, Marcie Ulin; ABC
The Newsroom — Brendan Fehily, David Handelman, Cinque Henderson, Paul Redford, Ian Reichbach, Amy Rice, Aaron Sorkin, Gideon Yago; HBO
Veep — Jesse Armstrong, Simon Blackwell, Roger Drew, Sean Gray, Armando Iannucci, Ian Martin, Tony Roche, Will Smith; HBO

Episodic Drama"The Other Woman" (Mad Men) — Semi Chellas and Matthew Weiner; AMC"Buyout" (Breaking Bad) — Gennifer Hutchison; AMC
"Dead Freight" (Breaking Bad) — George Mastras; AMC
"Fifty-One" (Breaking Bad) — Sam Catlin; AMC
"Say My Name" (Breaking Bad) — Thomas Schnauz; AMC
"New Car Smell" (Homeland) — Meredith Stiehm; Showtime

Episodic Comedy"Virgin Territory" (Modern Family) — Elaine Ko; ABC"The Debate" (Parks and Recreation) — Amy Poehler; NBC
"Episode Nine" (Episodes) — David Crane and Jeffrey Klarik; Showtime
"Leap Day" (30 Rock) — Luke Del Tredici; NBC
"Little Bo Bleep" (Modern Family) — Cindy Chupack; ABC
"Mistery Date" (Modern Family) — Jeffrey Richman; ABC

Long Form – OriginalHatfields & McCoys, Nights Two and Three — Teleplay by Ted Mann and Ronald Parker, story by Bill Kerby and Ted Mann; History ChannelHemingway & Gellhorn — Jerry Stahl and Barbara Turner; HBO
Political Animals, Pilot — Greg Berlanti; USA

Long Form – AdaptationGame Change — Danny Strong, based on the book by Mark Halperin and John Heilemann; HBOComa, Nights 1 and 2 — Teleplay by John McLaughlin, based on the book by Robin Cook; A&E

Animation"Ned 'n Edna's Blend" (The Simpsons) — Jeff Westbrook; Fox"A Farewell to Arms" (Futurama) — Josh Weinstein; Comedy Central
"Forget-Me-Not" (Family Guy) — David A. Goodman; Fox
"Holidays of Future Passed" (The Simpsons) — J. Stewart Burns; Fox
"Treehouse of Horror XXIII" (The Simpsons) — David Mandel & Brian Kelley; FOX

Comedy/Variety (including talk) seriesPortlandia — Fred Armisen, Carrie Brownstein, Karey Dornetto, Jonathan Krisel, Bill Oakley; IFCThe Colbert Report — Michael Brumm, Stephen Colbert, Rich Dahm, Paul Dinello, Eric Drysdale, Rob Dubbin, Glenn Eichler, Dan Guterman, Peter Gwinn, Barry Julien, Jay Katsir, Frank Lesser, Opus Moreschi, Tom Purcell, Meredith Scardino, Scott Sherman, Max Werner; Comedy Central
Conan — Jose Arroyo, Andres du Bouchet, Deon Cole, Josh Comers, Dan Cronin, Michael Gordon, Brian Kiley, Laurie Kilmartin, Rob Kutner, Todd Levin, Brian McCann, Conan O'Brien, Matt O'Brien, Jesse Popp, Andy Richter, Brian Stack, Mike Sweeney; TBS
The Daily Show — Rory Albanese, Kevin Bleyer, Richard Blomquist, Steve Bodow, Tim Carvell, Hallie Haglund, J.R. Havlan, Elliott Kalan, Dan McCoy, Jo Miller, John Oliver, Zhubin Parang, Daniel Radosh, Jason Ross, Lauren Sarver, Jon Stewart; Comedy Central
Jimmy Kimmel Live! — Tony Barbieri, Jonathan Bines, Joelle Boucai, Sal Iacono, Eric Immerman, Gary Greenberg, Josh Halloway, Bess Kalb, Jimmy Kimmel, Jeff Loveness, Molly McNearney, Bryan Paulk, Danny Ricker, Rick Rosner; ABC
Key & Peele — Jay Martel, Ian Roberts, Keegan-Michael Key, Jordan Peele, Sean Conroy, Colton Dunn, Charlie Sanders, Alex Rubens, Rebecca Drysdale; Comedy Central
Real Time with Bill Maher — Scott Carter, Adam Felber, Matt Gunn, Brian Jacobsmeyer, Jay Jaroch, Chris Kelly, Mike Larsen, Bill Maher, Billy Martin; HBO
Saturday Night Live — Seth Meyers, Writers: James Anderson, Alex Baze, Neil Casey, Jessica Conrad, James Downey, Shelly Gossman, Steve Higgins, Colin Jost, Zach Kanin, Chris Kelly, Joe Kelly, Erik Kenward, Rob Klein, Lorne Michaels, John Mulaney, Christine Nangle, Mike O’Brien, Josh Patten, Paula Pell, Marika Sawyer, Sarah Schneider, Pete Schultz, John Solomon, Kent Sublette, Bryan Tucker, Emily Spivey, Jorma Taccone, Frank Sebastiano; NBC

Comedy/Variety (including music, awards, tributes ) specials66th Tony Awards — Written by Dave Boone; Special Material by Paul Greenberg; Opening and Closing Songs by David Javerbaum, Adam Schlesinger; CBS27th Independent Spirit Awards — Billy Kimball, Wayne Federman; IFC
After the Academy Awards — Gary Greenberg, Molly McNearney, Tony Barbieri, Jonathan Bines, Sal Iacono, Eric Immerman, Jimmy Kimmel, Jeffrey Loveness, Bryan Paulk, Danny Ricker, Richard G. Rosner; ABC
National Memorial Day Concert — Joan Meyerson; PBS

Daytime DramaThe Young and the Restless — Amanda Beall, Jeff Beldner, Susan Dansby, Janice Ferri Esser, Jay Gibson, Scott Hamner, Marla Kanelos, Natalie Minardi Slater, Beth Milstein, Michael Montgomery, Anne Schoettle, Linda Schreiber, Sarah K. Smith, Christopher J. Whitesell, Teresa Zimmerman; CBSDays of Our Lives — Lorraine Broderick, Carolyn Culliton, Richard Culliton, Rick Draughon, Christopher Dunn, Lacey Dyer, Janet Iacobuzio, David A. Levinson, Ryan Quan, Dave Ryan, Melissa Salmons, Roger Schroeder, Elizabeth Snyder, Christopher J. Whitesell, Nancy Williams Watt; NBC
One Life to Live — Lorraine Broderick, Ron Carlivati, Anna Theresa Cascio, Daniel J. O’Connor, Elizabeth Page, Jean Passanante, Melissa Salmons, Katherine Schock, Scott Sickles, Courtney Simon, Chris Van Etten; ABC

Children's - Episodic and Specials"The Good Sport" (Sesame Street) — Christine Ferraro; PBSChildren's - Long Form or SpecialGirl vs. Monster — Story by Annie DeYoung, Teleplay by Annie DeYoung and Ron McGee; Disney ChannelDocumentary – Current Events"Money, Power and Wall Street: Episode One" (Frontline) — Martin Smith and Marcela Gaviria; PBS"The Anthrax Files" (Frontline) — Michael Kirk; PBS
"Lost in Detention" (Frontline) — Rick Young; PBS
"Money, Power and Wall Street: Episode Three" (Frontline) — Michael Kirk & Mike Wiser; PBS
"Money, Power and Wall Street: Episode Four" (Frontline) — Marcela Gaviria and Martin Smith; PBS
"A Perfect Terrorist" (Frontline) — Thomas Jennings; PBS

Documentary – Other than Current Events"The Fabric of the Cosmos: The Illusion of Time" (Nova) — Telescript by Randall MacLowry, story by Joseph McMaster and Randall MacLowry; PBS"The Amish" (American Experience) — David Belton; PBS
"Clinton" (American Experience) — Barak Goodman; PBS
"Death and the Civil War" (American Experience) — Ric Burns; PBS
"The Fabric of the Cosmos: Quantum Leap" (Nova) — Telescript by Josh Rosen and Julia Cort, story by Joseph McMaster and Josh Rosen; PBS
"Johnny Carson: King of Late Night" (American Masters) — Peter T. Jones; PBS

News – regularly scheduled, bulletin, or breaking report"Tragedy In Colorado: The Movie Theatre Massacre" (ABC News) — Lisa Ferri, Joel Siegel; ABCNews – analysis, feature, or commentary"The Ghost of Joe McCarthy" (Moyers & Company) — Bill Moyers, Michael Winship; Thirteen/WNET"Making History at Ole Miss" (CBS News) — Polly Leider; CBS
"The Regime Responds" (Frontline) — Marcela Gaviria; PBS
"Stem Cell Fraud" (60 Minutes) — Scott Pelley, Michael Rey and Oriana Zill de Granados, CBS

Radio

News – regularly scheduled or breaking report"World News This Year 2011" — Darren Reynolds; ABC News Radio"CBS Radio News" — Duane Tollison; CBS Radio News
"Local and National News" — Mark Hugh Miller; CBS Radio News
"Remembering Andy Williams" — Arlene Lebe; CBS Radio News

News – analysis, feature, or commentary"Dishin Digital" — Robert Hawley; WCBS-AM"Pre-existing Conditions and the Affordable Care Act" — Scott J. Saloway; CBS Radio News
"Tributes" — Gail Lee, CBS Radio News

Promotional Writing and Graphic Animation

On-Air Promotion (Radio or Television)"Partners" — Dan A. Greenberger; CBSTelevision Graphic Animation"The Oscars" (CBS News Sunday Morning'') — Bob Pook; CBS
"CBS News Animations" — David Rosen; CBS News

References

2012
Writers Guild of America Awards
Writers Guild of America Awards
Writers Guild of America Awards
Writers Guild of America Awards
2012 in American cinema
2012 in American television
Writers Guild of America Awards